This is a list of chicken breeds usually considered to originate in Canada and the United States. Some may have complex or obscure histories, so inclusion here does not necessarily imply that a breed is predominantly or exclusively from those countries.

References

Lists of North American domestic animal breeds
 
 
Chicken